Liu Changqing (709–785), courtesy name Wenfang was a Chinese poet and politician during the Tang dynasty. Eleven of his poems were collected in the popular anthology Three Hundred Tang Poems.

Biography 
Liu Changqing was born around either 710 or 725. He came from the city of Xuancheng. His ancestral hometown was Hejian. Most of his youth was spent in the city of Luoyang. Liu obtained his Jinshi title around 750s. In 780, he became the governor of Suizhou in Henan province. Because of his term in Suizhou, Liu was often called Liu Suizhou by his contemporaries.

He died around 786.

Poetry 
Liu's poems did not receive much praise during his lifetime although he was one of the representative poets during the reign of Emperor Dezong of Tang. However, he was gradually acknowledged by later generations. Liu was especially skillful on the writing of poems with 5 characters.
An example of his poetry can be seen below:

See also

Guqin history (includes one poem with sound track)
Huang Ruheng (a Ming Dynasty calligrapher of Liu Changching)

Notes

References

Works cited 
 
 
 

 
Watson, Burton (1971). CHINESE LYRICISM: Shih Poetry from the Second to the Twelfth Century. New York: Columbia University Press.

External links
 
Books of the Quan Tangshi that include collected poems of Liu Changqing at the Chinese Text Project:
Book 147
Book 148
Book 149
Book 150
Book 151

709 births
785 deaths
8th-century Chinese poets
Politicians from Xuancheng
Poets from Anhui
Tang dynasty politicians from Anhui
Three Hundred Tang Poems poets